Suzanne Lamy (September 30, 1929 – February 25, 1987) was a French-born educator, essayist and critic in Quebec.

She was born in Lombez and came to Quebec in 1954. She studied at the Université de Montréal and taught French and Quebec literature at the Cégep du Vieux-Montréal from 1968 to 1986. Lamy also lectured at the Université de Montréal and the Université de Sherbrooke.

She is best known for her two essays: D'elles (1979) and Quand je lis je m'invente (1984), which contributed to the development of feminist criticism in Quebec. Her writing appeared in various magazines such as Châtelaine, Forces, Cahiers du centre de recherche sur le surréalisme and Actuellement. She was manager for the cultural magazine Spirale from 1984 to 1986.

She died in Montreal at the age of 57.

Selected works

References 

1929 births
1987 deaths
Canadian feminist writers
Canadian women essayists
People from Gers
Canadian non-fiction writers in French
20th-century Canadian women writers
20th-century Canadian essayists
Canadian feminists
French essayists
French women writers
French feminist writers
French women essayists
20th-century French women